The 1938–39 season was Manchester United's 43rd season in the Football League. Newly promoted back to the First Division, they secured their survival with a 14th-place finish.

First Division

FA Cup

References

Manchester United F.C. seasons
Manchester United